Tattoo Fixers is a British reality television series to cover up members of the public's worst tattoos. As of 29 January 2019, 71 episodes have been broadcast, airing five series. 
As of 2019 two Christmas Specials and a Valentine’s Special have been broadcast, but these were not stylised under the usual title of (Series ?, Episode ?) but rather as a special.

Series overview

Episodes

Series 1 (2015) 
The first series of Tattoo Fixers aired on 23 June 2015 at 10:00pm on E4 The series ran through every Tuesday, for nine weeks, until the final episode on 18 August 2015.

Series 2 (2015–16) 
On 18 August 2015, the show's official Twitter account tweeted "BOOM! That's #TattooFixers over for the series but we will be back very soon."; confirming the commission of a second series. In addition, cast member Jay announced on his Facebook account that the show would be returning. On 19 August 2015, Daily Post rumoured that filming for the second series would commence in October 2015. The second series started airing on 22 December 2015, airing fifteen episodes. The first eleven episodes were aired on Tuesday nights, whilst the remaining four episodes were broadcast on Monday nights.

Series 3 (2016–17) 
A new series of Tattoo Fixers started on 7 December 2016.

Series 4 (2017–18)

Series 5 (2018–19)

References

Lists of British non-fiction television series episodes